During the 1918–19 English football season, Brentford competed in the London Combination, due to the cessation of competitive football for the duration of the First World War. Buoyed by larger crowds after the Armistice, Brentford finished the season as champions of the London Combination.

Season summary

Brentford entered the London Combination for the fourth consecutive season in 1918–19, for what would become the final campaign of wartime football during the First World War. Just 11 contracted players would be available throughout the course of the season, which necessitated the use of a large number of guest players, the most notable of whom being future internationals Jackie Carr, Jack Cock and Fred Bullock (England), Fred Keenor (Wales) and Jack Doran (Ireland). Cock, Henry White and Ted Hanney all played in an England trial match on 14 April 1919.

A chronic lack of players saw Brentford win just one of the opening six matches of the season. The turnaround came when Jack Cock returned team after settling a dispute, which if left unsettled, would have led him to play for Fulham during the season. The Bees' forward line was immediately galvanised and the goals of Cock, Henry White and Fred Morley lead Brentford on a run of 11 wins in 14 matches in all competitions. The Armistice of 11 November 1918 brought the war to a close and attendances began to rise, which coupled with the club only having to pay its players £2 a week plus expenses, meant that Brentford ended the season with a profit of £2,000 (£ in ).

Despite four draws in January 1919 and three losses in February (which included a second round defeat to Crystal Palace in the one-off London Victory Cup), a return to form and a 2–0 victory over nearest challengers Arsenal on 15 March put the Bees eight points clear at the top of the table with six matches left to play. Aided by additional goals from Patsy Hendren and Royal Navy serviceman Billy Baker, Brentford finished the season as champions, marking the first time the club had finished top of a division since winning the Southern League Second Division title in 1900–01. On 7 April, with three matches of the regular season to play, Brentford were invited to play a fundraising friendly match versus a 'Rest Of The Southern League XI' at The Den. Brentford lost the match 2–1.

One more former Brentford player died before the end of the war – Sapper Fred Alborough, who made three appearances as a guest in September and October 1918. He died of influenza on 31 October 1918, just five days after his final Brentford appearance. He had served with the Royal Engineers during the war. Former wartime guest players sergeant Dick Wynn and shoeing smith Billy Matthews died in circumstances related to their service in August 1919 and April 1921 respectively.

League table

Results
Brentford's goal tally listed first.

Legend

London Combination

London Victory Cup

 Source: 100 Years of Brentford

Playing squad 
Players' ages are as of the opening day of the 1918–19 season.

 Sources: 100 Years of Brentford, Timeless Bees, Football League Players' Records 1888 to 1939

Coaching staff

Statistics

Appearances and goals

Players listed in italics left the club mid-season.
Source: 100 Years of Brentford

Goalscorers 

Players listed in italics left the club mid-season.
Source: 100 Years of Brentford

Management

Summary

Transfers & loans 
Guest players' arrival and departure dates correspond to their first and last appearances of the season.

References 

Brentford F.C. seasons
Brentford